Dmytro is a Ukrainian name, derived from the Greek Demetrios. Nicknames of the name Dmytro include: Dima, Dimochka, Dimula, Dimusha, Dimusya, Metro (particularly in Canada), Mitya, Mitenka, Mityai, Mityaychik, Mityusha, Mityushenka, Mityulya, Mityunya. (Діма, Дімочка, Дімуля, Дімуша, Дімуся, Метро, Митя, Мітенька, Митяй, Мітяйчік, Мітюша, Мітюшенька, Мітюля, Мітюня.)

Dmytro may refer to:

Dmytro Antonovych (1877–1945), Ukrainian politician and art historian
Dmytro Babenko (born 1979), Ukrainian footballer
Dmytro Bezotosnyy (born 1983), Ukrainian footballer
Dmytro Boiko (born 1986), Ukrainian sabre fencer
Dmytro Boyko (born 1981), Ukrainian professional footballer
Dmytro Brovkin (born 1984), professional Ukrainian football striker
Dmytro Chumak (fencer) (born 1980), Ukrainian épée fencer
Dmytro Chyhrynskyi (born 1986), Ukrainian footballer
Dmytro Dontsov (1883–1973), Ukrainian nationalist writer, publisher, journalist and political thinker
Dmytro Doroshenko (1882–1951), Ukrainian political figure during the revolution of 1917–1918
Dmytro Grabovskyy (born 1985), Ukrainian professional road bicycle racer
Dmytro Hlushchenko (born 1981), Ukrainian sprinter who specializes in the 100 and 200 metres
Dmytro Hnatyuk (1925–2016), famous Ukrainian baritone opera singer, and later parliament member
Dmytro Hordiyenko (born 1983), professional Ukrainian football striker
Dmytro Hrachov (born 1983), athlete from Ukraine
Dmytro Hryshko (born 1985), professional Ukrainian football defender
Dmytro Hrytsai (1907–1945), leader in the Organization of Ukrainian Nationalists
Dmytro Hunia, elected hetman of the Zaporozhian Host in 1638
Dmytro Khovbosha (born 1989), professional Ukrainian football defender
Dmytro Klyachkivsky (1911–1945), colonel of the UPA, commander of the Ukrainian Insurgent Army (UPA)-North
Dmytro Korchynskyy, famous Ukrainian public figure, poet and publicist
Dmytro Kozachenko, Ukrainian professional football goalkeeper
Dmytro Kozban (born 1989), professional Ukrainian football striker
Dmytro Levytsky (1877–1942), lawyer and major political figure in western Ukraine between the two world wars
Dmytro Lyopa (born 1988), Ukrainian football midfielder
Dmytro Lysenko (born 1981), Ukrainian diver
Demitro "Dick" Michayluk (1911–1990), politician in Saskatchewan, Canada
Dmytro Mikhay (born 1990), Ukrainian rower
Dmytro Mykhaylenko (born 1973), Ukrainian midfielder
Dmytro Nazarov (born 1977), Ukrainian football defender
Dmytro Nevmyvaka (born 1984), professional Ukrainian football player
Dmytro Parfenov (born 1974), retired Ukrainian footballer
Dmytro Pavlychko, Ukrainian poet, translator, scriptwriter, culturologist, political and public figure
Dmytro "Metro" Prystai (1927–2013), Canadian ice hockey player
Dmytro Semochko (born 1979), Ukrainian footballer
Dmytro Shutkov (born 1972), Ukrainian footballer
Dmytro Stoyko (born 1975), Ukrainian football goalkeeper
Dmytro Tereshchenko (born 1987), Ukrainian professional footballer
Dmytro Tiapushkin (born 1964), retired Ukrainian professional footballer and a current coach
Dmytro Timashov (born 1996), Ukrainian–Swedish ice hockey player (forward)
Dmytro Topchiyev (born 1966), retired Russian born Ukrainian professional footballer
Dmytro Tyapushkin (born 1964), retired Ukrainian professional footballer and a current coach
Dmytro Vitovsky (1887–1919), Ukrainian politician and military leader
Dmytro Vladov (born 1990), Ukrainian football midfielder
Dmytro Voloshyn (disambiguation) (both born 1986), two different Ukrainian football defenders
Dmytro Vorobey (born 1985), Ukrainian footballer
Dmytro Vorobyov (born 1977), Ukrainian football goalkeeper
Dmytro Vyshnevetsky, Hetman of the Ukrainian Cossacks
Dmytro Yakimischak (1888–1958), politician in Manitoba, Canada
Dmytro Yavornytsky (1855–1940), Ukrainian historian, archeologist, ethnographer, folklorist, and lexicographer
Dmytro Yesin (born 1980), professional Ukrainian football midfielder
Dmytro Zabirchenko (born 1984), professional basketball player
Dmytro Zhdankov (born 1984), professional Ukrainian football goalkeeper
Dmytro Zipchen (1905–1996), politician in Saskatchewan, Canada
Voivode Dmytro, appointed military commander of Kyiv by Prince Danylo of Galicia in 1239, charged with defending the city from the Mongols

Ukrainian masculine given names